Talatu Yohanna (born November 11, 1973) is an administrator and politician. She was a member of the Nigerian House of Representatives where she represented Demss/Numan/Lamurde Federal Constituency in Adamawa State.


Career
Yohanna started working as an administrator in public business, and later moved into politics where she has served as a women's leader, supervisory councilor, special assistant and special adviser to the Governor of Adamawa State. She has also served as a Commissioner  for Trade and Cooperative in Adamawa State. She was a member of the House of Representatives where she represents Demsa/Numan/Lamurde Federal Constituency, Adamawa State under the All Progressives Congress. She was preceded by Kwamoti Laori a PDP candidate as the member representing Demsa/Numan/Lamurde Federal Constituency, Adamawa State. She also serves in the House Committee on Women Parliament.

Personal life
Yohanna is married and with children. She is an indigene of Ngodogoron community in Lamurde Local Government Area of Adamawa State.

References

Living people
Nigerian women in politics
Members of the House of Representatives (Nigeria)
1973 births
Women members of the House of Representatives (Nigeria)